The Bali Strait Bridge (JSB, is a proposed road and railway megaproject between the two Indonesian islands of Java and Bali.

The suggestion for a bridge was reportedly first put forward in 1960 by Professor Sedyatmo from Institut Teknologi Bandung as a part of broader plans, known as Tri Nusa Bimasakti, to link the three islands of Sumatra, Java and Bali.

The Indonesian government has considered the bridge across the Bali Strait, while the Indonesian Government is planning the design of the bridge and there is no official date for construction yet.

See also
 Sunda Strait Bridge
 Bali Strait

References

Proposed bridges in Indonesia
Bali Strait